Shy is the debut studio album by English singer Stacey Solomon. It was released by Conehead Records on 19 April 2015, and debuted at number 45 on the UK Albums Chart.

Track listing

Charts

References

2015 debut albums
Stacey Solomon albums